Princess Jeongheon or known before as Princess Jeonghye was a Goryeo Royal Princess as the second and youngest daughter of King Hyejong and Queen Uihwa.

References

Goryeo princesses
Year of birth unknown
Year of death unknown